Clinton is a town and suburb of Gladstone in the Gladstone Region, Queensland, Australia.

History
The town was named on 5 January 1970.  On 10 December 1988 the suburb of Clinton was created from the merger of the former suburbs Clinton North and Clinton South. The name Clinton is derived from the County of Clinton (the cadastral administrative division containing Gladstone).

Clinton State School opened on 29 January 1974.

On 1 April 2010, a Priority Development Area was declared in Clinton with the aim of reducing housing pressure created with the growing mining industry in the Gladstone area.  of government land bounded by the Dawson Highway, Harvey Road and Keppel Avenue were released for residential land development.

The  revealed that the population of Clinton had risen to 6,170 people.

Education
Clinton State School is a government primary (Early Childhood-6) school for boys and girls at Harvey Road.  In 2015, the school has 820 students with 51 teachers (44 equivalent full-time). In 2018, the school had an enrolment of 950 students with 70 teachers (63 full-time equivalent) and 54 non-teaching staff (31 full-time equivalent). It includes a special education program.

Facilities 
Gladstone Airport is on Aerodrome Road.

The Port Curtis Lawn Cemetery is on Aerodrome Road. It provides lawn graves for burials and a columbarium wall and memorial garden for the interment of cremains.

References

Suburbs of Gladstone
Towns in Queensland